Kuyulu is a village in the District of Aydın, Aydın Province, Turkey. As of the 2010 Turkish Census, it had a population of 1,195 people.

References

Villages in Efeler District